Vladimir Stolypin (born 20 February 1937) is a Soviet former sports shooter. He competed at the 1968 Summer Olympics and the 1972 Summer Olympics.

References

1937 births
Living people
Soviet male sport shooters
Olympic shooters of the Soviet Union
Shooters at the 1968 Summer Olympics
Shooters at the 1972 Summer Olympics
Sportspeople from Moscow